Jan Maroši (born 4 November 1965) is a Czech former football player. He made two international appearances for the Czechoslovakia national football team and is also known for having scored directly from a corner for Sigma Olomouc in a 1992–93 UEFA Cup match against Juventus. He made a total of 366 top flight appearances spanning the end of the Czechoslovak First League and the beginning of the Gambrinus liga, scoring 67 goals. In 2006 Maroši was ranked 15th on the list of players with most appearances in the Czech and/or Czechoslovak top flight since the Czechoslovak First League began in 1925.

Olomouc
Maroši started out at Sigma Olomouc in 1987. Olomouc achieved third-place finishes in the Czechoslovak First League in 1990–91 and 1991–92 and subsequently qualified twice for the UEFA Europa League. In the 1991–92 UEFA Cup, Maroši scored in the second round match against Torpedo Moscow and Olomouc went on to reach the quarter finals.

In the following season's 1992–93 UEFA Cup, Maroši again featured in Olomouc's European campaign, scoring the fourth goal in a 7–1 thrashing of Fenerbahçe in the second round. Although he scored a late goal directly from a corner against Juventus in the third round, it was to no avail as Juventus went on to win the tie comfortably, 7–1 on aggregate and subsequently went on to win the whole competition.

Brno
Maroši spent the second half of his career at Brno, joining in 1994. After Pavel Tobiáš became manager of Brno in the 2000–01 Gambrinus liga, Maroši was told he was surplus to requirements, signalling an end to his playing career at the top level.

After the top
Maroši went on to work as assistant coach to Roman Kotol at Dolní Kounice in the 2002–03 Czech 2. Liga.

After his career as a football player, Maroši became director of a sport school in Brno. In 2009, he became chairman of the City Football Association in Brno.

Personal life
Maroši's nephew, Martin Maroši, is also a professional footballer.

References

External links
 
 
 Profile at FC Zbrojovka Brno website 

1965 births
Living people
Sportspeople from Plzeň
Czech footballers
Czechoslovak footballers
Czechoslovakia international footballers
Czech First League players
SK Sigma Olomouc players
FC Zbrojovka Brno players
Expatriate footballers in Austria
Association football midfielders